Wes W. Lucas (born May 2, 1963) is an American business executive. He is currently an Operations Partner at Gryphon Investors in their Industrial Growth team. Prior to Gryphon, he was President and Chief Executive Officer at SIRVA since 2008.

Career
From 2007 to 2008, Lucas served as the co-founder and a board member at BioMass Capital, a renewable energy company.  From 2001 to 2006, Lucas served as Chairman, Chief Executive Officer and President of Sun Chemical, the world’s largest color company, with 300 operating plants and approximately $4 billion in annual sales.  During 2001 to 2006, he also served as co-Chairman of Kodak Polychrome, a leading media company.  Previous significant leadership roles also include serving as Chief Executive Officer and President of Quebecor World, a $6 billion printing services company; chief executive officer of OpenWebs, a provider of business-to-business software that optimizes sales and inventories; President of Sytrenics Nova Chemicals, a producer of plastics and materials; a vice president responsible for strategy and Asia at AlliedSignal, a multibillion-dollar industrial company; and as a management consultant with McKinsey & Company.

Boards
Lucas currently serves on the Board of SIRVA since 2008, Pepperdine University since 2014, and also is on the Business Roundtable since 2012.  Previous Board Chairman positions include serving as Chairman of Sun Chemical from 2001 to 2006, as co-Chairman of Kodak Polychrome from 2002 to 2006, and as Chairman of OpenWebs from 2000 to 2002.  Other previous Board membership positions include serving as a Director of Quebecor World in 2006 and 2007, and as a Director of the U.S. Chamber of Commerce until 2012.

Education
Lucas holds a master's degree in Business Administration from Harvard Business School in 1990 and a Bachelor of Science degree in finance and accounting from the University of California, Berkeley in 1985.

Personal life
Lucas was married to his wife in August 1989. They have two children. 
Lucas enjoys the outdoors and is an avid skier competing in national competitions.

Citations

American chief executives
Harvard Business School alumni
Haas School of Business alumni
Living people
1963 births